Acosmeryx miskinoides is a moth of the  family Sphingidae. It is known from Papua New Guinea.

References

Acosmeryx
Moths described in 2007
Moths of New Guinea